The following is an incomplete list of paintings by Frans Hals that are generally accepted as autograph by the Frans Hals Museum and other sources. The list is more or less in order of creation, starting from around 1610 when Frans Hals began painting on his own. Prior to that he was employed by the Haarlem council as a city art restorer and before that he was assistant to Karel van Mander.

See also
 Marriage pendant portraits by Frans Hals – a subset of this list showing the marriage pendants side-by-side
 Frans Hals catalogue raisonné, 1974 – the list of 222 paintings attributed as autograph by Seymour Slive in 1974
 Frans Hals catalogue raisonné, 1989 – the list of 145 paintings attributed as autograph by Claus Grimm in 1989

Sources

 Frans Hals, by Seymour Slive, a catalogue raisonné of Hals works by Seymour Slive: Volume Three, the catalogue, National gallery of Art: Kress Foundation, Studies in the History of European Art, London – Phaidon Press, 1974
 Frans Hals, by Seymour Slive (editor), with contributions by Pieter Biesboer, Martin Bijl, Karin Groen and Ella Hendriks, Michael Hoyle, Frances S. Jowell, Koos Levy-van Halm and Liesbeth Abraham, Bianca M. Du Mortier, Irene van Thiel-Stroman,  Prestel-Verlag, Munich & Mercatorfonds, Antwerp, 1989, 
Frans Hals: het gehele oeuvre, by Claus Grimm, Amsterdam, Meulenhoff/Landshoff, 1990
Exhibition on the Occasion of the Centenary of the Municipal Museum at Haarlem, 1862–1962, catalogue of the Frans Hals Museum, 1962
Exhibition on the Occasion of the 75th birthday of the Municipal Museum at Haarlem in 1937, catalogue of the Frans Hals Museum, 1937
 Frans Hals in the RKD

 List
Hals, Frans